Selwyn Jacob is a Canadian documentary filmmaker whose work has often explored the experiences of Black Canadians as well as other stories from Canada's multicultural communities, as both as an independent director and since 1997 as a producer with the National Film Board of Canada (NFB).

Background 
Selwyn Jacob was born in Trinidad, West Indies in 1941. Jacob attended a teacher's college there before traveling to Canada in 1968 to complete a Bachelor of Education at the University of Alberta in Edmonton. While in Edmonton, he was influenced and mentored by film producer, author and broadcaster Fil Fraser. After graduation, Jacob completed a master's degree in film studies at the USC School of Cinematic Arts.

Directing
It was while teaching in Lac La Biche, Alberta in the late 1970s that Jacob had the idea for his first film: a documentary about black immigrants from Oklahoma who settled in Amber Valley, Alberta, which after several years of research was completed as We Remember Amber Valley (1984). Jacob has stated that at the time he was the only Afro-Canadian film director in the province of Alberta.

Jacob's subsequent directorial  credits include The Saint from North Battleford (1989), a portrait of Rueben Mayes; Carol's Mirror (1991), an educational film about racism and equality; Al Tasmim, a film about Canada's oldest mosque; and The Road Taken (1996), a documentary about the history of Black railway porters, which received the Canada Award from the Academy of Canadian Cinema and Television.

Producing
Jacob's interest in Black Canadian non-fiction storytelling continued as NFB producer, supplemented by a notable range of films by Asian Canadian filmmakers from Canada's western provinces, exploring their communities' culture and histories, as well. His NFB producing credits include The Journey of Lesra Martin, about Lesra Martin, a Canadian youth who helped to free Rubin "Hurricane" Carter from prison; Jeni LeGon: Living in a Great Big Way (1999), a portrait of Jeni Le Gon, a Vancouver resident who had been one of the first Black women entertainers in Hollywood to sign a long-term contract with a major Hollywood studio; John McCrae's War: In Flanders Fields (1998), a look at Canadian army doctor John McCrae, who wrote the poem, "In Flanders Fields"; Colleen Leung's Letters from Home (2001); Linda Ohama's Obāchan's Garden (2001); Ling Chiu's From Harling Point (2003), about the first Chinese cemetery in Canada; Eunhee Cha's A Tribe of One (2003); and Mighty Jerome (2010), a documentary film about African-Canadian track star Harry Jerome directed by Charles Officer.

In 2014, Jacobs produced Ninth Floor, directed by Mina Shum. The film documents a 1969 Montreal student protest against racism known as the Sir George Williams Affair, and was filmed in Montreal on the 45th anniversary of the event. It was an event Jacob had been aware of at the time, as a number of its participants had been from Trinidad—including one from his home village—and Jacob has stated that it was always his intention to make a film about the incident.

References

External links

Selwyn Jacob at the Canadian Archival Information Network

Trinidad and Tobago emigrants to Canada
Black Canadian filmmakers
Film producers from Alberta
Canadian documentary film directors
Canadian documentary film producers
National Film Board of Canada people
Canadian Screen Award winners
Film directors from Alberta
Cinema of British Columbia
University of Alberta alumni
USC School of Cinematic Arts alumni
Trinidad and Tobago film directors
Living people
1941 births